Annaatthe is an 2021 Indian Tamil-language action film directed by Siva and produced by Kalanithi Maran under the banner of Sun Pictures. The film stars Rajinikanth, Khushbu, Meena, Nayanthara and Keerthy Suresh while Jagapathi Babu, Prakash Raj and Soori star 
in prominent roles. The music for the film is composed by D. Imman while cinematography and editing are performed by Vetri and Ruben respectively. It revolves around Kaalaiyan, who is a sarpanch in Thanjavur. He adores his younger sister Thanga Meenatchi dearly and does everything to make her happy. When she elopes with her lover to Kolkata, he goes to great lengths to protect her from the clutches of an evil corporate businessman called Manoj Parekar and his elder brother Udhav Parekar, a ruthless crime boss.

The film was officially announced in October 2019, marking Rajinikanth's first collaboration with Siva. Principal photography for the film began on 11 December 2019, on the eve of the actor's birthday, and was completed within September 2021. The shooting process went on for one-and-a-half years, as a result of the COVID-19 pandemic lockdown in India and Rajinikanth's health issues in late-December 2020, delayed the film's production. The film was shot primarily in Ramoji Film City in Hyderabad, with few sequences shot at Chennai.

Annaatthe was released on 4 November 2021, on the occasion of Diwali. The film received mixed-to-negative reviews from critics. In spite of the negative reviews and heavy rain, the film was a commercial success at the box office, grossing around  upon its release.
Also, the movie successfully crossed 150 crores landmark in Tamil Nadu Box office alone and became the third movie to have this achievement at that time.
After its first TV premier/telecast, Annaatthe became the 3rd highest TRP rated Tamil movie of all time.
Annaatthe (Tamil) crossed 1.3 million tickets sold on BookMyShow becoming the first movie to hit the million mark on the platform after the second Unlock in 2021.

Plot 
Kaalaiyan is a local village president in Soorakkottai, Thanjavur and also the village's saviour who bows to moral fairness. These ideals lead him to clash with a rival village leader Nattadurai,  who rules by controlling the people by scaring them. When Nattadurai tries to extort land from an old man, he hires Pattammal, a lawyer, to defend his case. Kaalaiyan exposes the truth and Pattammal betrays her own client and withdrew the case. Pattammal and Kaalaiyaan soon fall in love.

Kalaiyan's world revolves around his sister, Thanga Meenatchi, whom he has lovingly raised after the death of their parents. After she returns home having completed her education, Kaalaiyan faces difficulty in finding a groom for her as everyone is afraid of him. Kaalaiyan's annoying cousin sisters, Angayarkanni and Mangaiyarkarasi, both propose that their brothers marry Thanga Meenatchi. They had both  wanted to marry Kaalaiyan but he had not agreed. A lot of drama follows. Thanga Meenatchi's marriage is arranged with Nattadurai's younger brother without her mental permission.

The day of the wedding, Meenatchi escapes from his superstitious brother. Kaalaiyan dispatches a search party who catch Meenatchi on a train, trying to elope with her boyfriend from college. Torn by his love for his sister, Kaalaiyan allows Meenatchi to leave and staves off demands for an honour killing from relatives. Meenatchi shifts to Kolkata with her husband and loses contact with Kaalaiyan. Kaalaiyan and Pattamal travel to Kolkata. Kaalaiyan finds out that his sister has serious financial troubles. He secretly follows her and finds out she has borrowed money from a gangster.

When the gangster tries to assault Meenatchi, Kaalaiyan secretly beats him up and moves Meenatchi to Pattammal's apartment, where he can safely watch on her. Meenatchi is threatened by thugs watching her and falls ill. When Pattammal leaves the house to get her medicine, the thugs attack her. Kaalaiyan rescues her and interrogates the attackers, and learns the truth.

Past: When Meenatchi and her husband started a business in Kolkata, they were approached by Manoj Parekar, a wealthy businessman and underworld boss. Manoj wanted to purchase half of their shares but Meenatchi's husband had refused. Over the following weeks, Meenatchi's factory had caught fire, they were forced to shut it down, and her husband was arrested under trumped-up charges and was being tortured in police custody. Meenatchi had begged Manoj to get her husband released and signed over her company. Manoj had refused to get him released and got everyone who agreed to help her murdered.

Present: Meenatchi is still trying to get her husband released with Pattammal's help, only to realise that she is pregnant. Kaalaiyan is very happy on hearing this and he and Pattammal organise a baby shower for her.

After learning the truth behind Meenatchi's misfortune, Kaalaiyan wanted to kill gangsters by using his sister as a bait and swears to destroy Manoj Parekar. Under the name of Annaatthe, Kaalaiyan and his village friends storm Manoj's office and issues an ultimatum. After more drama, Annaatthe corners Manoj and forces him to sign his name on papers saying that he will return the companies he stole to their former owners. Kaalaiyan decides to spare Manoj's life.

Humiliated, Manoj visits his estranged brother, Udhav Parekar, demanding Annaatthe be finished and then commits suicide. Udhav tracks down Meenatchi and brings men to attack her. Pattammal, instructed by Kaalaiyan, hides her. Pattammal and Meenatchi are chased by the men until the two are separated by a crashing auto-rickshaw. Kaalaiyan arrives and clobbers all of Udhav's men and kills Udhav. He finally reveals himself to Meenatchi, who tearfully apologises for all the trouble she put her brother through.

Cast 

 Rajinikanth as Kaalaiyan alias Annaatthe.
 Bhavaz as Young Kaaliyaan.
 Khushbu as Angaiyarkanni.
 Meena as Mangayarkarasi "Mangai".
 Nayanthara as Adv. Pattamal, Kaalaiyaan's love interest.
 Keerthy Suresh as Thanga Meenatchi, Kaalaiyaan's sister.
 Jagapathi Babu as Udhav Parekar.
 Abhimanyu Singh as Manoj Parekar, Udhav Parekar's brother.
 Soori as Pachakili, Kaalaiyaan's sidekick.
 Bala as Arjun, Manoj's sidekick.
 Prakash Raj as Nattadurai.
 Kulappulli Leela as Kaalaiyaan's grandmother.
 Vela Ramamoorthy as Kaalaiyan's uncle.
 Livingston as Irulandi, Mangayarkarasi's husband.
 Pandiarajan as Idithangi, Angayarkanni's husband.
 Sathish as Sathyaseelan, Angayarkanni's brother.
 Sathyan as Azhagudurai, Mangayarkarasi's brother.
 Redin Kingsley as Puli Pandi, Nattadurai's assistant.
 George Maryan as Komberi Mookan, Kaalaiyaan's sidekick.
 Arjai as Kaalaiyaan's sidekick.
 Thavasi as a priest.
 Vishwanth as Kaalaiyaan's sidekick.
 Ravi Awana as Manoj's sidekick.
 Anjali Nair as Kaalaiyan and Meenakshi's mother.
 Sriranjini as Nattadurai's wife.
 Sai Siddarth as Nattadurai's younger brother
 Sreeja Ravi as a doctor.
 Naadodigal Gopal as Kaalaiyan's uncle.
 Rajitha as Kaalaiyan's aunt.
 Piraisoodan as Kaalaiyan's uncle.
 Hrishikesh as a potential groom.
 Ayyappa P. Sharma as Manoj's henchman
 Mukthar Khan as Udhav Parekar's right-hand man

Production

Development 

In mid-October 2019, media reports claimed that Rajinikanth will be working with director Siva, after the release of Darbar (2020), but it was later confirmed by Kalanithi Maran on 11 October 2019, whose production house Sun Pictures bankrolling the venture, tentatively titled the project as Thalaivar 168, as it marks Rajinikanth's 168th film project. It also marks Rajinikanth's third collaboration with Sun Pictures after Endhiran and Petta. Though composer D. Imman, who worked previously with the director in Viswasam (2019), was reported to score music for the film, his inclusion was confirmed by the producer in mid-November. It was reported that the movie will be titled as Viyugam and Mannavan, however the team denied the rumours. The film's title Annatha was revealed on 24 February 2020, then the title had a slight change which named it Annaatthe.

Pre-production 
Siva's usual technical crew, Vetri, Ruben, Milan and Dilip Subbarayan, who worked in the director's earlier films, excluding Subbarayan, as he worked with Siva only in Viswasam, were reported to be the film's cinematographer, editor, art director and stunt choreographer respectively. Rajinikanth had penned some punch lines in his film. Initially, the actor was reported to be paid  crore as his salary for the film, but Kalanithi Maran insisted him to decrease the salary post the failure of Darbar and was also ready to shelve the project if Rajinikanth had refused to do so. After much deliberation, Rajinikanth had reported to have agreed to decrease his salary.

Casting 
On 23 October 2019, Keerthy Suresh was signed in to act in a pivotal role. Later comedian Soori, was reported to play another prominent role. The inclusion of Soori and Suresh were confirmed by Sun Pictures on the mid-week of December 2019. Keerthy Suresh was reported to essay the role of Rajinikanth's step sister in the film. In December 2019, the producers also confirmed that Meena and Khushbu, will be the female leads for Rajinikanth in Thalaivar 168. Prakash Raj and Sathish too joined the film's cast before the start of the shoot, with actor Vishwanth, who worked with Rajinikanth in Kabali (2016), too joined the cast. On 31 January 2020, Sun Pictures later announced that Nayanthara will also be a part of the film's cast, essaying the role of a lawyer in the film. Actor Vela Ramamoorthy, too joined the cast, essaying a crucial role. Telugu actor Gopichand, was reported to play the antagonist in the film, but however the actor refuted such claims. Jackie Shroff was hired to play the film's antagonist, but was replaced by Jagapathi Babu in March 2021. Abhimanyu Singh appeared in a pivotal role in August 2021. It will also be the posthumous film of Thavasi, who earlier appeared in Varuthapadatha Valibar Sangam (2013) and Rajinimurugan (2015).

Filming 

Principal photography of the film was commenced on 11 December 2019, on the eve of actor Rajinikanth's birthday. The film's cast and crew were present at the pooja ceremony held at the office of Sun TV Network in Chennai. Filming began on 18 December 2019, at Ramoji Film City in Hyderabad with a song shoot, while Khushbu joined shooting for her portions, a few days after filming began. Rajinikanth went to shoot for an episode of Man vs. Wild at the Bandipur forest in Karnataka, which resulted in delay of the film's shoot. After the announcement of Nayanthara's inclusion, the actress joined the sets in February 2020. The makers planned to shoot a few sequences in Kolkata and Pune after the completion of two schedules in Hyderabad, but dropped the idea due to the fear of COVID-19 pandemic and decided to continue the shoot at Hyderabad. Filming was further halted due to the pandemic.

It was reported that the team will shoot some sequences in Chennai after lockdown since the team will find it difficult to head to Hyderabad for the shoot. After the government gave permissions to resume film and television production after the pandemic, Rajinikanth was reported to join the sets in October 2020. However the makers postponed the film's shooting to November, citing the team's safety. In mid November 2020, the makers officially stated that the shooting will resume on 15 December 2020 with Rajinikanth joining the schedule, and was expected to be completed within a single stretch in order to complete the shoot quickly. Rajinikanth headed to Hyderabad on 14 December and started the shoot before the scheduled date, with Nayanthara being present on the film's sets. Sources claimed that Rajinikanth worked for more than fourteen hours in order to complete the film's shoot, before the actor's entry into politics. But the film's shoot however was halted on 23 December 2020, after eight crew members were diagnosed with COVID-19, although Rajinikanth being tested negative, the actor has undergone self-quarantine in Hyderabad. However Rajinikanth was hospitalised on 25 December 2020, due to fluctuating blood pressure, and was discharged on 27 December.

Following Rajinikanth's health, the makers planned to resume shooting in Chennai on 15 March 2021, with a single schedule being shot within 30 days. After Tamil Nadu state legislative assembly elections, Rajinikanth headed to Hyderabad for the next schedule shoot in April 2021. Shooting of the film happened at a brisk pace, despite night curfew and other restrictions. The team shot a few stunt sequences featuring Rajinikanth and for the night sequences, the team sought permission from the government as well as Hyderabad police to shoot the night scenes. The team ensured safety at the sets while filming at a brisk pace. Nayanthara joined the film's team in late April 2021, and scenes featuring Rajinikanth and Nayanthara were shot within three days.

Post-production 
On 10 May 2021, it was announced that Rajinikanth had completed his portions for the film, except for few patchwork sequences. The final schedule of the film took place at a private studio in Chennai in July 2021. In August, except for minor portions the stunt sequences of the film had been wrapped up, with Rajinikanth and Khushbu began dubbing for their portions. With the final copy of the film being ready by September 2021, the film was sent to Central Board of Film Certification (CBFC) for public viewing, where the film got U/A certificate from the Censor Board. The film's final runtime is of 163 minutes, with the first half consisting of 83 minutes and the duration of the second half is about 80 minutes.

Music 

The soundtrack for the film was composed by D. Imman, collaborating with actor Rajinikanth for the first time, and featured lyrics written by Thamarai, Viveka, Yugabharathi, Arun Bharathi, Mani Amuthavan and Arivu. In an interview with Sudhir Srinivasan of The New Indian Express, Imman said that "Fans expect certain factors from Rajinikanth's songs. On the other hand, I want the album to carry my identity as well. I have to cater to both. In addition to that, Rajini sir is acting in a full-fledged rural entertainer after a while. So, the album should justify all these aspects." Composition of the songs held during January–March 2020, and after being interrupted due to COVID-19 pandemic lockdown in that month; was later resumed on November. The music works of the film were completed within February 2021. The album will reportedly have six tunes; five songs and a theme track, and feature lyrics written by Thamarai, Viveka, Yugabharathi, Arun Bharathi, Mani Amuthavan and Arivu. Imman said that the album will consist songs of varied genres: a mass track (which is the opening song of the film), melody, dance and festive numbers. Sun Pictures had planned to withhold the audio rights, along with the satellite and digital rights of the film and had planned to release the entire soundtrack the company. Veteran singer S. P. Balasubrahmanyam, had recorded an introduction song (later deciphered as "Annaatthe Annaatthe") for Rajinikanth in the film, which marks his last song before his death on 25 September 2020. Imman said that the track was considered to be the "best-ever opening song" for Rajinikanth. Other singers who crooned the songs from the music album were K.S. Chithra, Sid Sriram, Shreya Ghoshal, Anirudh Ravichander, Diwakar and the composer Imman himself. The soundtrack was reported to feature about five songs and a theme music; totally six tracks in the soundtrack album, and has varied genres — opening song, melody, dance and festive numbers. Deciding not to tie-up with music labels, Sun Pictures released the album through their own production house with lyric videos released on the official YouTube channel of Sun TV. The lyrics of all the songs were in Tamil texts instead of English lyrics. The opening track "Annaatthe Annaatthe" was the first to be released. Considering it as a heartfelt tribute to the deceased singer S. P. Balasubrahmanyam, Rajinikanth penned an emotional note about the singer, and finally saying that he will "live forever through his voice". Another two singles — "Saara Kaatrae" and "Marudhaani" — were released on 6 and 11 October 2021, respectively. The lyrical song "Vaa Saamy" was released on 25 October 2021, along with the audio jukebox on YouTube. The songs were later released through music streaming platforms. a week later, on 1 November 2021, without any promotional event due to the ongoing COVID-19 pandemic restrictions. The soundtrack, included the earlier released singles, gained positive response from audience and topped the charts online.

Release

Theatrical 
Initially Annaatthe was scheduled to release coinciding with the eve of Dusshera (25 October 2020). Later, in May 2020, Sun Pictures announced that the movie will be scheduled to release during the occasion of Pongal (14 January 2021). But the movie was postponed further citing the delay in filming due to the COVID-19 pandemic. In January 2021, the producers announced that the film will be released on 4 November 2021, coinciding with Diwali festival.

Prior to the theatrical release, Rajinikanth watched the first show of the film, with his daughter Soundarya Rajinikanth, grandsons Yathra and Linga. Soundarya, in her newly launched social media platform Hoote, shared her review about the film, saying:

Screening and statistics 
The film will release in over 2100 theatres across the world, with 900 theatres belonging to India, due to Enemys huge demand. and another 1193 screens in the overseas centres, a widest for a Tamil film after the COVID-19 lockdown. Naman Ramachandran of Variety magazine reported that, the film will release on 677 screens in United States, 17 screens in Canada, 110 screens in Malaysia, 23 screens in Singapore, 35 screens in the United Kingdom, 43 screens across Europe, 85 screens jointly in Australia and New Zealand, 117 screens in the United Arab Emirates and 86 screens in Sri Lanka. In the domestic regions, 600 screens were allotted by theatre owners across Tamil Nadu, for the film's release. On 30 October 2021, the advanced bookings for the film began at limited screens in Tamil Nadu, to tremendous response, despite the lack of promotional activities, with the increase in seating capacity to 100% also piqued the interest of the audience to watch the film according to trade analysts. The first show of the film will be scheduled at 4:00 AM on the day of the release.

Distribution 
Udhayanidhi Stalin's Red Giant Movies purchased the distribution rights of the film in Tamil Nadu. UFO Moviez gained acquisition for the theatrical rights in North India, for the Tamil version of the film. Qube Cinema acquired the theatrical rights in United States and Canada. Ahead of the Indian theatrical release on 4 November 2021, Qube planned to release the film earlier on 3 November in over 700 screens across 56 locations, the highest for a Tamil film. 4Seasons Creations bought the distribution rights of the film in Europe.

Home media 
Sun Pictures also gained acquisition for the non-theatrical rights with the television to Sun TV and streaming rights to Sun NXT belonging to Sun TV Network in all South-Indian languages, also tying with Netflix for a wide digital release. The film then premiered on 25 November 2021 just 22 days after the theatrical release on both Sun NXT and Netflix.

Reception

Box office 
The film grossed  worldwide on the first day  including  in Tamil Nadu topping Sarkar. On the second day, the film grossed 42.63 crores with the total 2 day gross standing at 112.82 crores crossing the 100 crore mark. On the third day, the film grossed 33.71 crores with the 3 day gross standing at 146.53 crores. The film has reportedly grossed more than $600K within 3 days to emerge as the best Tamil movie of this year in USA. On the fifth day the film grossed 11.85 crores with the total day 5 gross of the film being an approximate 186.58 crores thereby crossing the 150 crore mark. On the sixth day, the film grossed 9.50 crores and on the 7 day the film grossed 6.39 crores with the total worldwide collection being 202.47 crores. The film collected 202.47 crores on week 1 and received 4.05 crores on the first day of the second week totalling up to 206.52 crores worldwide. The film remained steady on day 10 grossing 4.90 crores bringing the total to 211.42 crores.

On day 11, the film grossed 6.21 crores rounding up the total to 217.63 crores. On the 12th day, the film grossed 7.14 crores with the worldwide collection being 224.77 crores. On the 13th day, the film collected 1.02 crores bringing the total to 225.79 crores. The film grossed 1.33 crores on the 14th day rounding the total worldwide collection to 227.12 crores. In Tamil Nadu, the film grossed 140.60 crores. On day 15, the film grossed 1.67 crores bringing the total worldwide collection to 228.79 crores. The film grossed 1.56 crores on day 16 bringing the total collection to 230.35 crores. On day 17, the film grossed 1.70 crores with the worldwide collection being an approximate 232.05 crores.

The film grossed 2.62 crores on the 18th day bringing total to 234.67. On the 19th day, the film grossed 3.54 crores with the worldwide collection being 238.21 crores. The film grossed 57 lakhs on the 20th day bringing the total to 238.78 crores. On the 21st day the film grossed 43 lakhs to bring the total to 239.21 crores. The film also grossed 39 lakhs in Tamil Nadu thereby crossing the 150 crore mark in Tamil Nadu alone.

Critical response 

The film received negative reviews.

Times of India gave the film 2 out of 5 writing "If Petta felt like a pastiche of Rajinikanth's films, Annaatthe seems like a collage made out of the weaker moments from director Siva's filmography. We have the villains from Siruthai, the 'saviour who cannot reveal his identity' angle from Veeram, the brother-sister sentiment from Vedalam, and the rural backdrop from Viswasam. The result is a movie whose emotional beats feel blatantly calculated and manipulative. Given that the sibling bond is its core, we expect scenes that show us why and how Kaalaiyan and Meenatchi are close. Instead, like in the recent Udanpirappe, characters only keep talking about the relationship! With this leading to an unaffecting tale, D Imman's use of a sentimental score hardly adds an emotional punch to the action scenes, which are shot in a generic manner."  Sify gave the film 2.5 out of 5 writing "The bottom line about Annaatthe is that, although the old Rajini formula is back, the entertainment we had witnessed in those days is missing in this 2021 film." Mirchi9 gave the film 1.75 out of 5 writing "Overall, Annaatthe is a very formulaic and routine mass sentiment fare that is predictable and outdated from the word go. The biggest of names go through the motions providing no fun and vigour. It will be a favour to every Superstar fan if they forget the movie exists." Hindustan Times gave the film a negative review writing "Annaatthe is unarguably the weakest film in Siva's filmography. For all those who complained Darbar was Rajinikanth's lamest film in recent years, they'll change their opinion as they step out of Annaatthe."

Behindwoods gave the film 2.5 out of 5 writing "Overall, it's a template driven formulaic film that's high on brother-sister sentiment. One unique aspect is that the film doesn't want to entirely depend on Rajinikanth. The director wants the sentiment to work out, with Rajini being a medium for it. Whether it's successful or not is a question for another day. But for a festival film, this might be a good option to celebrate with your family members." Moviecrow gave the film 2 out of 5 writing "Expected a cracker of a festival entertainer, but turns out as a disappointing formulaic outing majorly due to its bland storytelling." India Today gave the film 2 out of 5 writing "Overall, Annaatthe did have the potential to be a moving family drama. However, it is the screenplay that tests everyone's patience." The Quint wrote "Annaatthe has Rajinikanth in probably his worst film since Baba and in a performance that displays the weariness of a hitchhiker air dropped in the middle of a desert and left with an empty water bottle.

The News Minute gave the film 1 out of 5 writing "Meena and Khushbu appear in a completely jarring comedy track, and it's sad to see the actors being reduced to this. Rajinikanth reels off punch dialogues faster than a jet plane but you can see that the man is tired. The affection you have for the actor makes you forgive the obvious stiffness in his body, the glaring age difference between him and the woman he's romancing, the pasty make-up and much else. But even his biggest fan would admit that this film is a colossal mess. I know you want to ask the question — is it worse than Lingaa, worse than Darbar? PACHAKILI, what do I tell you? Absolutely." Indian express gave the film 1 out of 5 writing "Annaatthe features one of the biggest stars of India, and all it has to offer is a bunch of questionable wisdom on affection and relationships. There is something really wrong with what we consider big movies." Bolywood life gave the film 2 out of 5 writing "Annaatthe is Rajinikanth's swag and all his swag, which coupled with the action scenes and background score, barely make a preachy, patriarchal, predictable long-drawn out, rehashed script barely watchable. Gulf News gave the film 2.5 out of 5 writing "Yet, despite some original dialogues and Imman's foot-tapping music, on the whole, 'Annaatthe' ends up being a sentimental drama that has very little to offer in terms of entertainment." NDTV gave the film 2 out of 5 while writing "The moniker is absolutely apt and not for him alone. What does the superstar do in this lumbering movie to help its stale cocktail of sentimentality, swag and silliness gather momentum? He parrots lines that we have heard before. That, in short, is Annaatthe: a moth-eaten mess whose mustiness even Rajinikanth at full tilt cannot mitigate."

Ashameera Aiyappan of First Post gave a rating of 2 out of 5 stating that "Nevertheless, in a Rajinikanth film, the craft is secondary. One goes to the theatres purely for the man's electrifying screen presence. In Annaatthe, the Thalaivar looks good. He does what he usually does. The energy, the charisma — it is all there. But what used to look effortless, now seems arduous. Even though he tries hard to not let it show, you can sense the tiredness. His past few releases have been attempts to recreate the vintage Rajini, but the Superstar has so much more to offer. Will we get to see that though? I am not sure." Indiaglitz gave the film 2.5 out of 5 stating that "Annaatthe settles as a routine entertainer that works in parts. It brings back the vintage Rajini film formula but fails to amaze the audience." Sudhir Srinivasan of The New Indian Express stated that "As we seem to slowly near the end of his filmography (there are constantly rumours about what might be his last film), there's the temptation to lap up whatever we get. That's perhaps why Siva went all the way back to the 90s in search of a winning recipe. And that's also perhaps why Annaatthe might have been better served with a final scene that establishes happiness and joy among the characters, as opposed to its rather downing end. After all, when Rajinikanth laughs, it makes everyone happy." Ananda Vikatan rated the film 39 out of 100. Only Kollywood gave the film's rating 2.75 out of 5 and wrote "It's been years since we have seen the Superstar in such a rural outing, and he rules the roost from the very first scene in his own style. The mischief and the frolic that we usually associate with his earlier films such as Padayappa and Muthu is back and roaring here, as we get to see him performing the right 'Rajinisms'. Overall, Annaatthe works out as a templated family entertainer that has nothing special going for it except for Superstar Rajinikanth's screen presence and energy levels."

References

External links 

2021 action drama films
2021 films
Film productions suspended due to the COVID-19 pandemic
Films postponed due to the COVID-19 pandemic
Films directed by Siva (director)
Films scored by D. Imman
Films shot in Hyderabad, India
Indian action drama films
Sun Pictures films